The men's normal hill individual ski jumping competition for the 1994 Winter Olympics was held in Lysgårdsbakken. It occurred on 25 February.

Results
Source:

References

Ski jumping at the 1994 Winter Olympics